Colorado station  is an light rail station in Denver, Colorado, United States. It is served by the E and H Lines, operated by the Regional Transportation District (RTD), and was opened on November 17, 2006. The station is located next to the Colorado Center, a large movie theater and office building complex. The station features a public art sculpture entitled Big Boots, which was created by Ries Niemi and dedicated in 2006.

References 

RTD light rail stations in Denver
Railway stations in the United States opened in 2006
2006 establishments in Colorado